Leo P. Carlin (August 12, 1908 – December 17, 1999) was the Democratic Mayor of Newark, New Jersey  from 1953 to 1962.

Biography

He was born on August 12, 1908, in Newark, New Jersey to Hugh Carlin and Annie Duffy. He was one of 22 children that his father had with his two wives. He attended Saint Benedict's Preparatory School, but left before graduating, to go to work to help support his family. He first served on the New Jersey General Assembly. He was president of Newark's Board of Education and was the longtime president of Local 478 of the Brotherhood of Teamsters and Chauffeurs.

The only or one of the few mayors since 1962 to leave office with a positive balance in Newark's budget.  One of the major contribution Carlin made was to call together the CEOs of Newark's 18 largest corporations in an effort to stem the outward movement of companies to the suburbs.  The Star-Ledger wrote:
The term New Newark came into existence in 1954, largely as a result of the recently elected Mayor Leo Carlin, who called together the CEOs of Newark's 18 largest corporations in an effort to stem the outward movement of companies to the suburbs. At first, the organization was composed exclusively of business leaders who met quarterly. One of its best-known chairs was David Yunich, president of Bamberger's. ... But as time passed, the organization expanded to encompass the Newark Economic Development Committee. It was made up of representatives not only from business, but also labor and government, and better represented the whole community. One of its recommendations called for the redevelopment of the area adjoining Pennsylvania Station.
He died on December 17, 1999, in Avon-by-Sea, New Jersey, aged 91.

See also
List of mayors of Newark, New Jersey

References

1908 births
1999 deaths
Mayors of Newark, New Jersey
People from Avon-by-the-Sea, New Jersey
New Jersey Democrats
20th-century American politicians